A sociogram is a graphic representation of social links that a person has. It is a graph drawing that plots the structure of interpersonal relations in a group situation.

Overview 
Sociograms were developed by Jacob L. Moreno to analyze choices or preferences within a group. They can diagram the  structure and patterns of group interactions. A sociogram can be drawn on the basis of many different criteria:  Social relations, channels of influence, lines of communication etc.

Those points on a sociogram who have many choices are called stars. Those with  few or no choices are called isolates. Individuals who choose each other are known to have made a mutual choice. One-way choice refers to individuals who choose someone but the choice is not reciprocated. Cliques are groups of three or more people within a larger group who all choose each other (mutual choice).

Sociograms are the charts or tools used to find the sociometry of a social space.

Under the social discipline model, sociograms are sometimes used to reduce misbehavior in a classroom environment. A sociogram is constructed after students answer a series of questions probing for affiliations with other classmates. The diagram can then be used to identify pathways for social acceptance for misbehaving students. In this context, the resulting sociograms are known as a friendship chart. Often, the most important person/thing is in a bigger bubble in relation to everyone else. The size of the bubble represents the importance, with the biggest bubble meaning most important and the smallest representing the least important.

Gallery

See also 
 Social network analysis software
 Corporate interlocks
 Diagram
 Network science
 Organizational chart
 Social balance theory
 Sociomapping
 Sociometry
 Barry Wellman

References

External links 

Graph drawing
Organizational theory
Social network analysis